This is a comprehensive listing of the bird species recorded in Dry Tortugas National Park, which is in the U.S. state of Florida. This list is based on one published by the National Park Service (NPS) that as of February 2004 contained 281 species. Of them, 131 are occasionally observed, 11 are rarely observed, 23 are known or possible breeders, five have been introduced to North America, and one is extinct, all as defined below.

This list is presented in the taxonomic sequence of the Check-list of North and Middle American Birds, 7th edition through the 63rd Supplement, published by the American Ornithological Society (AOS). Common and scientific names are also those of the Check-list, except that the common names of families are from the Clements taxonomy because the AOS list does not include them.

The NPS checklist notes the abundance of each species by season. These status codes have been used to annotate some species; those without a tag are typically observed at least 11 times in at least one season.

(O) Occasionally observed - a species found one to five times in the season with the most records
(R) Rarely observed - a species found six to 10 times in the season with the most records
(B) Breeding - a species known to breed in the park
(B?) Possibly breeding - a species whose breeding status is unknown
(I) Introduced - a species that has been introduced to North America by the actions of humans, either directly or indirectly, and has become established in Florida
(E) Extinct - a recent bird that no longer exists

Ducks, geese, and waterfowl

Order: AnseriformesFamily: Anatidae

The family Anatidae includes the ducks and most duck-like waterfowl, such as geese and swans. These birds are adapted to an aquatic existence with webbed feet, flattened bills, and feathers that are excellent at shedding water due to special oils.

Fulvous whistling-duck, Dendrocygna bicolor (O)
Snow goose, Anser caerulescens (O)
Canada goose, Branta canadensis (O)
Blue-winged teal, Spatula discors
Northern shoveler, Spatula clypeata (O)
Gadwall, Mareca strepera (O)
Mallard, Anas platyrhynchos (O)
Northern pintail, Anas acuta (O)
Green-winged teal, Anas crecca (O)
Ring-necked duck, Aythya collaris (O)
Lesser scaup, Aythya affinis (O)
Common eider, Somateria mollissima (O)
Hooded merganser, Lophodytes cucullatus (O)
Red-breasted merganser, Mergus serrator

Flamingoes
Order: PhoenicopteriformesFamily: Phoenicopteridae

Flamingos filter-feed on shellfish and algae. Their oddly shaped beaks are adapted to separate mud and silt from the food they consume and, uniquely, are used upside-down.

American flamingo, Phoenicopterus ruber (O)

Grebes

Order: PodicipediformesFamily: Podicipedidae

Grebes are small to medium-large freshwater diving birds. They have lobed toes and are excellent swimmers and divers. However, they have their feet placed far back on the body, making them quite ungainly on land.

Pied-billed grebe, Podilymbus podiceps (O)

Pigeons and doves
Order: ColumbiformesFamily: Columbidae

Pigeons and doves are stout-bodied birds with short necks, and short slender bills with a fleshy cere.

Rock pigeon, Columba livia (I) (R)
White-crowned pigeon, Patagioenas leucocephala (O)
Eurasian collared-dove, Streptopelia decaocto (I) (O)
Common ground dove, Columbina passerina (O)
Ruddy quail-dove, Geotrygon montana (O)
White-tipped dove, Leptotila verreauxi (O)
White-winged dove, Zenaida asiatica
Zenaida dove, Zenaida aurita (O)
Mourning dove, Zenaida macroura

Cuckoos
Order: CuculiformesFamily: Cuculidae

The family Cuculidae includes cuckoos, roadrunners, and anis. These birds are of variable size with slender bodies, long tails, and strong legs.

Yellow-billed cuckoo, Coccyzus americanus
Mangrove cuckoo, Coccyzus minor (B?) (O)
Black-billed cuckoo, Coccyzus erythropthalmus (R)
Smooth-billed ani, Crotophaga ani (B?) (R)

Nightjars and allies

Order: CaprimulgiformesFamily: Caprimulgidae

Nightjars are medium-sized nocturnal birds that usually nest on the ground. They have long wings, short legs, and very short bills. Most have small feet, of little use for walking, and long pointed wings. Their soft plumage is cryptically colored to resemble bark or leaves.

Lesser nighthawk, Chordeiles acutipennis (O)
Common nighthawk, Chordeiles minor
Antillean nighthawk, Chordeiles gundlachii (R)
Chuck-will's-widow, Antrostomus carolinensis
Eastern whip-poor-will, Antrostomus vociferus (O)

Swifts
Order: ApodiformesFamily: Apodidae

The swifts are small birds, spending most of their lives flying. They have very short legs and never settle voluntarily on the ground, perching instead only on vertical surfaces. Many swifts have very long swept-back wings which resemble a crescent or boomerang.

Black swift, Cypseloides niger (One record in the NPS checklist; not on the official Florida Ornithological Society list)
Chimney swift, Chaetura pelagica

Hummingbirds

Order: ApodiformesFamily: Trochilidae

Hummingbirds are small birds capable of hovering in mid-air due to the rapid flapping of their wings. They are the only birds that can fly backwards.

Ruby-throated hummingbird, Archilochus colubris
Black-chinned hummingbird, Archilochus alexandri (O)

Rails, gallinules, and coots

Order: GruiformesFamily: Rallidae

The Rallidae is a large family of small to medium-sized birds which includes the rails, crakes, coots, and gallinules. The most typical family members occupy dense vegetation in damp environments near lakes, swamps, or rivers. In general they are shy and secretive, making them difficult to observe. Most have strong legs with long toes, short rounded wings, and are weak fliers.

Clapper rail, Rallus crepitans (O)
King rail, Rallus elegans (O)
Virginia rail, Rallus limicola (O)
Sora, Porzana carolina
Common gallinule, Gallinula galeata (B?) (O)
American coot, Fulica americana (O)
Purple gallinule, Porphyrio martinicus
Black rail, Laterallus jamaicensis (O)

Limpkin
Order: GruiformesFamily: Aramidae

The limpkin is an odd bird that looks like a large rail, but is skeletally closer to the cranes. It is found in marshes with some trees or scrub in the Caribbean, South America, and southern Florida.

Limpkin, Aramus guarauna (O)

Cranes
Order: GruiformesFamily: Gruidae

Cranes are large, tall birds with long legs and long necks. Unlike the similar-looking but un-related herons, cranes fly with necks extended. Most have elaborate and noisy courtship displays or "dances". When in a group, they may also "dance" for no particular reason, jumping up and down in an elegant manner, seemingly just for pleasure or to attract a mate.

Sandhill crane, Antigone canadensis (O)

Stilts and avocets
Order: CharadriiformesFamily: Recurvirostridae

Recurvirostridae is a family of large wading birds which includes the avocets and stilts. The avocets have long legs and long up-curved bills. The stilts have extremely long legs and long, thin, straight bills.

Black-necked stilt, Himantopus mexicanus
American avocet, Recurvirostra americana (O)

Oystercatchers
Order: CharadriiformesFamily: Haematopodidae

The oystercatchers are large, conspicuous, and noisy plover-like birds, with strong bills used for smashing or prising open molluscs.

American oystercatcher, Haematopus palliatus (O)

Plovers and lapwings
Order: CharadriiformesFamily: Charadriidae

The family Charadriidae includes the plovers, dotterels, and lapwings. They are small to medium-sized birds with compact bodies, short thick necks, and long, usually pointed, wings. They are generally found in open country, mostly in habitats near water.

Black-bellied plover, Pluvialis squatarola
American golden-plover, Pluviali dominicas 
Killdeer, Charadrius vociferus
Semipalmated plover, Charadrius semipalmatus
Piping plover, Charadrius melodus (R)
Wilson's plover, Charadrius wilsonia (R)

Sandpipers and allies

Order: CharadriiformesFamily: Scolopacidae

Scolopacidae is a large and diverse family of small to medium-sized shorebirds which includes the sandpipers, curlews, godwits, shanks, tattlers, woodcocks, snipes, dowitchers, and phalaropes. Most eat small invertebrates picked out of the mud or sand. Different lengths of legs and bills enable multiple species to feed in the same habitat, particularly on the coast, without direct competition for food.

Upland sandpiper, Bartramia longicauda
Whimbrel, Numenius phaeopus (R)
Long-billed curlew, Numenius americanus (O)
Ruddy turnstone, Arenaria interpres
Red knot, Calidris canutus (O)
Ruff, Calidris pugnax (O)
Stilt sandpiper, Calidris himantopus (O)
Sanderling, Calidris alba
Dunlin, Calidris alpina (O)
Baird's sandpiper, Calidris bairdii (O)
Least sandpiper, Calidris minutilla
White-rumped sandpiper, Calidris fuscicollis
Buff-breasted sandpiper, Calidris subruficollis (O)
Pectoral sandpiper, Calidris melanotos (R)
Semipalmated sandpiper, Calidris pusilla
Western sandpiper, Calidris mauri (R)
Short-billed dowitcher, Limnodromus griseus
Long-billed dowitcher, Limnodromus scolopaceus (O)
American woodcock, Scolopax minor (O)
Wilson's snipe, Gallinago delicata (R)
Spotted sandpiper, Actitis macularius
Solitary sandpiper, Tringa solitaria (R)
Lesser yellowlegs, Tringa flavipes
Willet, Tringa semipalmata
Greater yellowlegs, Tringa melanoleuca
Wilson's phalarope, Phalaropus tricolor (O)
Red-necked phalarope, Phalaropus lobatus (O)

Skuas and jaegers
Order: CharadriiformesFamily: Stercorariidae

Skuas are medium to large seabirds, typically with gray or brown plumage, often with white markings on the wings. They have longish bills with hooked tips and webbed feet with sharp claws. They look like large dark gulls, but have a fleshy cere above the upper mandible. They are strong, acrobatic fliers.

Pomarine jaeger, Stercorarius pomarinus (O)
Parasitic jaeger, Stercorarius parasiticus (O)

Auks, murres, and puffins
Order: CharadriiformesFamily: Alcidae

Alcids are superficially similar to penguins due to their black-and-white colors, their upright posture, and some of their habits; however they are not closely related to penguins and are (with one extinct exception) able to fly. Auks live on the open sea, only deliberately coming ashore to breed.

Dovekie, Alle alle (O)

Gulls, terns, and skimmers

Order: CharadriiformesFamily: Laridae

The Laridae are a family of medium to large seabirds and containing the gulls, terns, kittiwakes, and skimmers. They are typically gray or white, often with black markings on the head or wings. They have stout, longish bills and webbed feet.

Sabine's gull, Xema sabini (O)
Bonaparte's gull, Chroicocephalus philadelphia (O)
Laughing gull, Leucophaeus atricilla (B)
Ring-billed gull, Larus delawarensis
Herring gull, Larus argentatus
Lesser black-backed gull, Larus fuscus (O)
Glaucous gull, Larus hyperboreus (O)
Great black-backed gull, Larus marinus (O)
Brown noddy, Anous stolidus (B)
Black noddy, Anous minutus (R)
Sooty tern, Onychoprion fuscata (B)
Bridled tern, Onychoprion anaethetus (O)
Least tern, Sternula antillarum (B) (R)
Gull-billed tern, Gelochelidon nilotica (O)
Caspian tern, Hydroprogne caspia (R)
Black tern, Chlidonias niger (O)
Roseate tern, Sterna dougallii (B)
Common tern, Sterna hirundo (B?) (R)
Forster's tern, Sterna forsteri (R)
Royal tern, Thalasseus maxima (B?)
Sandwich tern, Thalasseus sandvicensis
Black skimmer, Rynchops niger

Tropicbirds
Order: PhaethontiformesFamily: Phaethontidae

Tropicbirds are slender white birds of tropical oceans with exceptionally long central tail feathers. Their long wings have black markings, as does the head.

White-tailed tropicbird, Phaethon lepturus (B?)

Loons
Order: GaviiformesFamily: Gaviidae

Loons are aquatic birds the size of a large duck, to which they are unrelated. Their plumage is largely gray or black and they have spear-shaped bills. Loons swim well and fly adequately but, because their legs are placed towards the rear of the body, are clumsy on land.

Pacific loon, Gavia pacifica (O)
Common loon, Gavia immer (R)

Southern storm-petrels
Order: ProcellariiformesFamily: Oceanitidae

The storm-petrels are the smallest seabirds, relatives of the petrels, feeding on planktonic crustaceans and small fish picked from the surface, typically while hovering. The flight is fluttering and sometimes bat-like. Until 2018, this family's three species were included with the other storm-petrels in family Hydrobatidae.

Wilson's storm-petrel, Oceanites oceanicus (R)

Northern storm-petrels
Order: ProcellariiformesFamily: Hydrobatidae

Though the members of this family are similar in many respects to the southern storm-petrels, including their general appearance and habits, there are enough genetic differences to warrant their placement in a separate family.

Band-rumped storm-petrel, Hydrobates castro (O)

Shearwaters and petrels
Order: ProcellariiformesFamily: Procellariidae

The procellariids are the main group of medium-sized "true petrels", characterized by united tubular nostrils with a median septum.

Audubon's shearwater, Puffinus lherminieri (O)

Frigatebirds
Order: SuliformesFamily: Fregatidae

Frigatebirds are large seabirds usually found over tropical oceans. They are large, black, or black-and-white, with long wings and deeply forked tails. The males have colored inflatable throat pouches. They do not swim or walk and cannot take off from a flat surface. Having the largest wingspan-to-body-weight ratio of any bird, they are essentially aerial, able to stay aloft for more than a week.

Magnificent frigatebird, Fregata magnificens (B)

Boobies and gannets

Order: SuliformesFamily: Sulidae

The sulids comprise the gannets and boobies. Both groups are medium-large coastal seabirds that plunge-dive for fish.

Masked booby, Sula dactylatra (B)
Brown booby, Sula leucogaster (B?)
Red-footed booby, Sula sula (R)
Northern gannet, Morus bassanus (R)

Anhingas
Order: SuliformesFamily: Anhingidae

Anhingas, also known as darters or snakebirds, are cormorant-like water birds with long necks and long, straight beaks. They are fish eaters, diving for long periods, and often swim with only their neck above the water, looking rather like a water snake.

Anhinga, Anhinga anhinga (O)

Cormorants and shags
Order: SuliformesFamily: Phalacrocoracidae

Cormorants are medium-to-large aquatic birds, usually with mainly dark plumage and areas of colored skin on the face. The bill is long, thin, and sharply hooked. Their feet are four-toed and webbed.

Double-crested cormorant, Nannopterum auritum

Pelicans
Order: PelecaniformesFamily: Pelecanidae

Pelicans are very large water birds with a distinctive pouch under their beak. Like other birds in the order Pelecaniformes, they have four webbed toes.

American white pelican, Pelecanus erythrorhynchos (O)
Brown pelican, Pelecanus occidentalis (B)

Herons, egrets, and bitterns

Order: PelecaniformesFamily: Ardeidae

The family Ardeidae contains the herons, egrets, and bitterns. Herons and egrets are wading birds with long necks and legs. Herons are large and egrets are smaller. The cattle egret or "cow bird" is seen amongst flocks of cattle, for instance in ranches north of the Everglades. A bird will often attach itself to a particular bull, cow or calf, even being tolerated perching on the back or even the head of the animal. The birds are more shy than the animals, and will fly away if approached. The birds feed on various items turned over by the cattle as they graze and tramp the ground. Bitterns tend to be shorter necked and more secretive. Unlike other long-necked birds such as storks, ibises, and spoonbills, members of the Ardeidae fly with their necks pulled back into a curve.

American bittern, Botaurus lentiginosus (O)
Least bittern, Ixobrychus exilis (R)
Great blue heron, Ardea herodias
Great egret, Ardea alba
Snowy egret, Egretta thula
Little blue heron, Egretta caerulea
Tricolored heron, Egretta tricolor
Reddish egret, Egretta rufescens (O)
Cattle egret, Bubulcus ibis
Green heron, Butorides virescens (B?)
Black-crowned night-heron, Nycticorax nycticorax (R)
Yellow-crowned night-heron, Nyctanassa violacea

Ibises and spoonbills
Order: PelecaniformesFamily: Threskiornithidae

The family Threskiornithidae includes the ibises and spoonbills. They have long, broad wings. Their bodies are elongated, the neck more so, with long legs. The bill is also long, curved downward in the ibises, straight and markedly flattened in the spoonbills.

White ibis, Eudocimus albus
Glossy ibis, Plegadis falcinellus (R)
Roseate spoonbill, Platalea ajaja (O)

New World vultures
Order: CathartiformesFamily: Cathartidae

New World vultures are not closely related to Old World vultures, but superficially resemble them because of convergent evolution. Like the Old World vultures, they are scavengers. Unlike Old World vultures, which find carcasses by sight, New World vultures have a good sense of smell with which they locate carcasses.

Turkey vulture, Cathartes aura (O)

Osprey
Order: AccipitriformesFamily: Pandionidae

Pandionidae is a family of fish-eating birds of prey possessing a very large, powerful hooked beak for tearing flesh from their prey, strong legs, powerful talons, and keen eyesight. The family is monotypic.

Osprey, Pandion haliaetus

Hawks, eagles, and kites

Order: AccipitriformesFamily: Accipitridae

Accipitridae is a family of birds of prey that includes hawks, eagles, kites, harriers, and Old World vultures. They have very large, hooked beaks for tearing flesh from their prey, strong legs, powerful talons, and keen eyesight.

Swallow-tailed kite, Elanoides forficatus (O)
Northern harrier, Circus hudsonius
Sharp-shinned hawk, Accipiter striatus
Cooper's hawk, Accipiter cooperii (O)
Red-shouldered hawk, Buteo lineatus (R)
Broad-winged hawk, Buteo platypterus
Swainson's hawk, Buteo swainsoni (O)
Red-tailed hawk, Buteo jamaicensis (O)

Barn-owls
Order: StrigiformesFamily: Tytonidae

Barn-owls are medium to large owls with large heads and characteristic heart-shaped faces. They have long strong legs with powerful talons.

Barn owl, Tyto alba (O)

Owls
Order: StrigiformesFamily: Strigidae

Typical owls are small to large solitary nocturnal birds of prey. They have large forward-facing eyes and ears, a hawk-like beak, and a conspicuous circle of feathers around each eye called a facial disk.

Eastern screech-owl, Megascops asio (O)
Burrowing owl, Athene cunicularia (R)
Barred owl, Strix varia (O)
Long-eared owl, Asio otus (O)
Short-eared owl, Asio flammeus

Kingfishers
Order: CoraciiformesFamily: Alcedinidae

Kingfishers are medium-sized birds with large heads, long pointed bills, short legs, and stubby tails.

Belted kingfisher, Megaceryle alcyon

Woodpeckers

Order: PiciformesFamily: Picidae

Woodpeckers are small to medium-sized birds with chisel-like beaks, short legs, stiff tails, and long tongues used for capturing insects. Some species have feet with two toes pointing forward and two backward, while several species have only three toes. Many woodpeckers have the habit of tapping noisily on tree trunks with their beaks.

Red-headed woodpecker, Melanerpes erythrocephalus (O)
Yellow-bellied sapsucker, Sphyrapicus varius
Hairy woodpecker, Dryobates villosus (O)
Northern flicker, Colaptes auratus (O)

Falcons and caracaras
Order: FalconiformesFamily: Falconidae

The Falconidae is a family of diurnal birds of prey containing the falcons and caracaras. They differ from hawks, eagles, and kites in that they kill with their beaks instead of their talons.

American kestrel, Falco sparverius
Merlin, Falco columbarius
Peregrine falcon, Falco peregrinus

Tyrant flycatchers
Order: PasseriformesFamily: Tyrannidae

Tyrant flycatchers are passerines which occur throughout North and South America. They superficially resemble the Old World flycatchers, but are more robust and have stronger bills. They do not have the sophisticated vocal capabilities of the songbirds. Most, but not all, are rather plain. As the name implies, most are insectivorous.

Great crested flycatcher, Myiarchus crinitus (R)
La Sagra's flycatcher, Myiarchus sagrae (O)
Variegated flycatcher, Empidonomus varius (O)
Tropical kingbird, Tyrannus melancholicus (O)
Western kingbird, Tyrannus verticalis (R)
Eastern kingbird, Tyrannus tyrannus
Gray kingbird, Tyrannus dominicensis (B?)
Scissor-tailed flycatcher, Tyrannus forficatus (O)
Fork-tailed flycatcher, Tyrannus savana (O)
Olive-sided flycatcher, Contopus cooperi (O)
Eastern wood-pewee, Contopus virens
Cuban pewee, Contopus cariibaeus (O)
Yellow-bellied flycatcher, Empidonax flaviventris (O)
Acadian flycatcher, Empidonax virescens (O)
Least flycatcher, Empidonax minimus (O)
Black phoebe, Sayornis nigricans (O)
Eastern phoebe, Sayornis phoebe (R)

Vireos, shrike-babblers, and erpornis

Order: PasseriformesFamily: Vireonidae

The vireos are a group of small to medium-sized passerines restricted to the New World. They are typically greenish in color and resemble wood warblers apart from their heavier bills.

White-eyed vireo, Vireo griseus
Thick-billed vireo, Vireo crassirostris (O)
Yellow-throated vireo, Vireo flavifrons
Blue-headed vireo, Vireo solitarius
Philadelphia vireo, Vireo philadelphicus (R)
Warbling vireo, Vireo gilvus (R)
Red-eyed vireo, Vireo olivaceus
Black-whiskered vireo, Vireo altiloquus (B?)

Shrikes
Order: PasseriformesFamily: Laniidae

Shrikes are passerines known for their habit of catching other birds and small animals and impaling the uneaten portions of their bodies on thorns. A shrike's beak is hooked, like that of a typical bird of prey.

Loggerhead shrike, Lanius ludovicianus (O)

Crows, jays, and magpies
Order: PasseriformesFamily: Corvidae

The family Corvidae includes crows, ravens, jays, choughs, magpies, treepies, nutcrackers, and ground jays. Corvids are above average in size among the Passeriformes and some of the larger species show high levels of intelligence.

American crow, Corvus brachyrhynchos (O)

Tits, chickadees, and titmice
Order: PasseriformesFamily: Paridae

The Paridae are mainly small stocky woodland species with short stout bills. Some have crests. They are adaptable birds, with a mixed diet including seeds and insects.

Tufted titmouse, Baeolophus bicolor (O)

Swallows

Order: PasseriformesFamily: Hirundinidae

The family Hirundinidae is adapted to aerial feeding. They have a slender streamlined body, long pointed wings, and a short bill with a wide gape. The feet are adapted to perching rather than walking, and the front toes are partly joined at the base.

Bank swallow, Riparia riparia
Tree swallow, Tachycineta bicolor
Bahama swallow, Tachycineta cyaneovirdis (O)
Northern rough-winged swallow, Stelgidopteryx serripennis
Purple martin, Progne subis
Barn swallow, Hirundo rustica (B?)
Cliff swallow, Petrochelidon pyrrhonota
Cave swallow, Petrochelidon fulva

Kinglets
Order: PasseriformesFamily: Regulidae

The kinglets are a small family of birds which resemble the titmice. They are very small insectivorous birds in the genus Regulus. The adults have colored crowns, giving rise to their name.

Ruby-crowned kinglet, Corthylio calendula (R)

Waxwings
Order: PasseriformesFamily: Bombycillidae

The waxwings are a group of birds with soft silky plumage and unique red tips to some of the wing feathers. In the Bohemian and cedar waxwings, these tips look like sealing wax and give the group its name. These are arboreal birds of northern forests. They live on insects in summer and berries in winter.

Cedar waxwing, Bombycilla cedrorum

Gnatcatchers
Order: PasseriformesFamily: Polioptilidae

The family Polioptilidae is a group of small insectivorous passerine birds containing the gnatcatchers and gnatwrens.

Blue-gray gnatcatcher, Polioptila caerulea

Wrens
Order: PasseriformesFamily: Troglodytidae

Wrens are small and inconspicuous birds, except for their loud songs. They have short wings and thin down-turned bills. Several species often hold their tails upright. All are insectivorous.

House wren, Troglodytes aedon
Sedge wren, Cistothorus platensis (O)

Mockingbirds and thrashers
Order: PasseriformesFamily: Mimidae

The mimids are a family of passerine birds which includes thrashers, mockingbirds, tremblers, and the New World catbirds. They are notable for their vocalization, especially their remarkable ability to mimic a wide variety of birds and other sounds heard outdoors. The species tend towards dull grays and browns in their appearance.

Gray catbird, Dumetella carolinensis
Brown thrasher, Toxostoma rufum (O)
Bahama mockingbird, Mimus gundlachii (O)
Northern mockingbird, Mimus polyglottos (B?)

Starlings
Order: PasseriformesFamily: Sturnidae

Starlings are small to medium-sized passerines with strong feet. Their flight is strong and direct and they are very gregarious. Their preferred habitat is open country, and they eat insects and fruit. Their plumage is typically dark with a metallic sheen.

European starling, Sturnus vulgaris (I) (O)

Thrushes and allies
Order: PasseriformesFamily: Turdidae

The thrushes are a group of passerine birds that occur mainly but not exclusively in the Old World. They are plump, soft plumaged, small to medium-sized insectivores or sometimes omnivores, often feeding on the ground. Many have attractive songs.

Eastern bluebird, Sialia sialis (O)
Veery, Catharus fuscescens
Gray-cheeked thrush, Catharus minimus
Swainson's thrush, Catharus ustulatus
Hermit thrush, Catharus guttatus (R)
Wood thrush, Hylocichla mustelina
American robin, Turdus migratorius (O)

Old World sparrows
Order: PasseriformesFamily: Passeridae

Old World sparrows are small passerine birds. In general, sparrows tend to be small plump brownish or grayish birds with short tails and short powerful beaks. Sparrows are seed eaters, but they also consume small insects.

House sparrow, Passer domesticus (I)

Wagtails and pipits
Order: PasseriformesFamily: Motacillidae

Motacillidae is a family of small passerine birds with medium to long tails. They include the wagtails, longclaws, and pipits. They are slender, ground-feeding insectivores of open country.

American pipit, Anthus rubescens (O)

Finches, euphonias, and allies
Order: PasseriformesFamily: Fringillidae

Finches are seed-eating passerines. They are small to moderately large and have strong, usually conical and sometimes very large, beaks. All have twelve tail feathers and nine primaries. They have a bouncing flight with alternating bouts of flapping and gliding on closed wings, and most sing well.

American goldfinch, Spinus tristis (O)

New World sparrows

Order: PasseriformesFamily: Passerellidae

Until 2017, these species were considered part of the family Emberizidae. Most of the species are known as sparrows, but these birds are not closely related to the Old World sparrows which are in the family Passeridae. Many of these have distinctive head patterns.

Grasshopper sparrow, Ammodramus savannarum
Lark sparrow, Chondestes grammacus (O)
Chipping sparrow, Spizella passerina (O)
Clay-colored sparrow, Spizella pallida (O)
Field sparrow, Spizella pusilla (O)
Fox sparrow, Passerella iliaca (O)
Dark-eyed junco, Junco hyemalis (O)
White-crowned sparrow, Zonotrichia leucophrys (O)
White-throated sparrow, Zonotrichia albicollis (O)
Vesper sparrow, Pooecetes gramineus (O)
Seaside sparrow, Ammospiza maritima (O)
Savannah sparrow, Passerculus sandwichensis
Song sparrow, Melospiza melodia (O)
Lincoln's sparrow, Melospiza lincolnii (R)
Swamp sparrow, Melospiza georgiana (O)
Eastern towhee, Pipilo erythrophthalmus (O)

Spindalises
Order: PasseriformesFamily: Spindalidae

The members of this small family, newly recognized in 2017, are native to the Greater Antilles. One species occurs fairly frequently in Florida.

Western spindalis, Spindalis zena (O)

Yellow-breasted chat
Order: PasseriformesFamily: Icteriidae

This species was historically placed in the wood-warblers (Parulidae) but nonetheless most authorities were unsure if it belonged there. It was placed in its own family in 2017.

Yellow-breasted chat, Icteria vireos (O)

Troupials and allies

Order: PasseriformesFamily: Icteridae

The icterids are a group of small to medium-sized, often colorful, passerines restricted to the New World, including the grackles, New World blackbirds and New World orioles. Most have black as a predominant plumage color, often enlivened by yellow, orange or red.

Yellow-headed blackbird, Xanthocephalus xanthocephalus (O)
Bobolink, Dolichonyx oryzivorus
Eastern meadowlark, Sturnella magna (O)
Orchard oriole, Icterus spurius
Baltimore oriole, Icterus galbula
Red-winged blackbird, Agelaius phoeniceus (R)
Tawny-shouldered blackbird, Agelaius umeralis (O)
Shiny cowbird, Molothrus bonariensis (O)
Brown-headed cowbird, Molothrus ater (O)
Common grackle, Quiscalus quiscula (O)

New World warblers

Order: PasseriformesFamily: Parulidae

The wood warblers are a group of small, often colorful, passerines restricted to the New World. Most are arboreal, but some are terrestrial. Most members of this family are insectivores.

Ovenbird, Seiurus aurocapilla
Worm-eating warbler, Helmitheros vermivorum
Louisiana waterthrush, Parkesia motacilla
Northern waterthrush, Parkesia noveboracensis
Bachman's warbler, Vermivora bachmanii (E) (O)
Golden-winged warbler, Vermivora chrysoptera
Blue-winged warbler, Vermivora cyanoptera
Black-and-white warbler, Mniotilta varia
Prothonotary warbler, Protonotaria citrea
Swainson's warbler, Limnothlypis swainsonii (R)
Tennessee warbler, Leiothlypis peregrina
Orange-crowned warbler, Leiothlypis celata (O)
Nashville warbler, Leiothlypis ruficapilla
Connecticut warbler, Oporornis agilis
Mourning warbler, Geothlypis philadelphia (O)
Kentucky warbler, Geothlypis formosa
Common yellowthroat, Geothlypis trichas
Hooded warbler, Setophaga citrina
American redstart, Setophaga ruticilla
Cape May warbler, Setophaga tigrina
Cerulean warbler, Setophaga cerulea
Northern parula, Setophaga americana
Magnolia warbler, Setophaga magnolia
Bay-breasted warbler, Setophaga castanea
Blackburnian warbler, Setophaga fusca
Yellow warbler, Setophaga petechia
Chestnut-sided warbler, Setophaga pensylvanica
Blackpoll warbler, Setophaga striata
Black-throated blue warbler, Setophaga caerulescens
Palm warbler, Setophaga palmarum
Pine warbler, Setophaga pinus (O)
Yellow-rumped warbler, Setophaga coronata
Yellow-throated warbler, Setophaga dominica
Prairie warbler, Setophaga discolor
Black-throated gray warbler, Setophaga nigrescens (O)
Townsend's warbler, Setophaga townsendi (O)
Black-throated green warbler, Setophaga virens
Canada warbler, Cardellina canadensis (R)
Wilson's warbler, Cardellina pusilla (R)

Cardinals and allies

Order: PasseriformesFamily: Cardinalidae

The cardinals are a family of robust, seed-eating birds with strong bills. They are typically associated with open woodland. The sexes usually have distinct plumages.

Summer tanager, Piranga rubra
Scarlet tanager, Piranga olivacea
Western tanager, Piranga ludoviciana (O)
Northern cardinal, Cardinalis cardinalis (O)
Rose-breasted grosbeak, Pheucticus ludovicianus
Blue grosbeak, Passerina caerulea
Indigo bunting, Passerina cyanea
Painted bunting, Passerina ciris
Dickcissel, Spiza americana

Tanagers and allies
Order: PasseriformesFamily: Thraupidae

The tanagers are a large group of small to medium-sized passerine birds restricted to the New World, mainly in the tropics. Many species are brightly colored. As a family they are omnivorous, but individual species specialize in eating fruits, seeds, insects, or other types of food. Most have short, rounded wings.

Bananaquit, Coereba flaveola (O)
Yellow-faced grassquit, Tiaris olivaceus (O)

See also
List of birds of the United States
List of birds of Florida
List of birds of Everglades National Park

References

External links
Florida Ornithological Society
Pictures of birds of Florida

Birds, Dry Tortugas National Park
Florida, Dry Tortugas
Dry Tortugas National Park